Missenyi District is one of the eight districts of the Kagera Region of Tanzania. The district was created in 2007, separating from Bukoba District. It is bordered to the north by Uganda, to the east by Bukoba Rural District, to the south by Karagwe District and to the west by Kyerwa District.

Administrative subdivisions 
As of 2012, Missenyi District was administratively divided into 20 wards with 77 villages.

Wards 

 Bugandika
 Bugorora
 Buyango
 Bwanjai
 Gera
 Ishozi
 Ishunju
 Kakunyu
 Kanyigo
 Kashenye
 Kassambya
 Kilimilile
 Kitobo
 Kyaka
 Mabale
 Minziro
 Mushasha
 Mutukula
 Nsunga
 Ruzinga

Transport 
Paved trunk road T4 from Mwanza to the Ugandan border passes through Missenyi District. Unpaved trunk road T38 to Ngara District, through Karagwe District, branches off from T4 in the village of Kyaka.

References 

 
Districts of Kagera Region